The 2015 Holy Cross Crusaders football team represented the College of the Holy Cross in the 2015 NCAA Division I FCS football season. They were led by 12th-year head coach Tom Gilmore and played their home games at Fitton Field. They were a member of the Patriot League. They finished the season 6–5, 3–3 in Patriot League play to finish in fourth place.

Schedule

Roster

References

Holy Cross
Holy Cross Crusaders football seasons
Holy Cross Crusaders football